Thianwei is a boma in Anyidi payam, Bor East County, Jonglei State, South Sudan, about 25 kilometers east of Bor and 5 kilometers from Anyidi village, the administrative center of Anyidi payam.

Demographics
According to the Fifth Population and Housing Census of Sudan, conducted in April 2008, Thianwei boma had a population of 5,636 people, composed of 2,945 male and 2,691 female residents.

Notes

References 

Populated places in Jonglei State